Edward Wells may refer to:

 Edward Wells (theologian) (1667–1727), English mathematician, geographer, and controversial theologian
 Edward Wells (MP) (1821–1910), English Conservative Party politician, MP for Wallingford 1872–80
 Edward Curtis Wells (1910–1986), director of Boeing Company, designer of the Boeing 747
 Edward Wells (flying ace) (1916–2005), New Zealand flying ace of the Royal New Zealand Air Force

See also 
 Wells (name)